Kan Tau Wai is a village in Ta Kwu Ling, North District, Hong Kong.

Administration
Kan Tau Wai is a recognized village under the New Territories Small House Policy.

References

External links
 Delineation of area of existing village Kan Tau Wai (Ta Kwu Ling) for election of resident representative (2019 to 2022)

Villages in North District, Hong Kong